Ben Northrup (born February 18, 1935) is an American wrestler. He competed in the men's Greco-Roman lightweight at the 1960 Summer Olympics.

References

External links
 

1935 births
Living people
American male sport wrestlers
Olympic wrestlers of the United States
Wrestlers at the 1960 Summer Olympics
People from Pullman, Washington